Harm is a moral and legal concept.

Bernard Gert construes harm as any of the following:
  pain
  death
  disability
mortality
  loss of ability or freedom
  loss of pleasure.

Joel Feinberg gives an account of harm as setbacks to interests.  He distinguishes welfare interests from ulterior interests.  Hence on his view there are two kinds of harm.

Welfare interests are 

Ulterior interests are "a person's more ultimate goals and aspirations", such as "producing good novels or works of art, solving a crucial scientific problem, achieving high political office, successfully raising a family".

See also
Injury (disambiguation)

References

Sources
  Feinberg, Joel.  1984.  The Moral Limits of the Criminal Law, Volume 1: Harm to Others.  New York: Oxford University Press.
  Bernard Gert, Common Morality, Oxford University Press, 2004.

Legal concepts